Lowther Store, also known as the John A. Hinkle and Son Store, is a historic general store located near Wheeler, Webster County, West Virginia.  It was built about 1900 and expanded about 1910.  The store is a one-story rectangular, wood-frame building with a foundation of field stones and posts.  Also on the property are a frame coal house, and a storage building located across the roadway.  It is the oldest continuous operating business in Webster County.

It was listed on the National Register of Historic Places in 1997.

References

Commercial buildings on the National Register of Historic Places in West Virginia
Commercial buildings completed in 1900
Buildings and structures in Webster County, West Virginia
National Register of Historic Places in Webster County, West Virginia